Cinesapiens is a 3D film by Edgar Pêra: a musical krypto-history of the Spectator, from the cave to holocinema. Cinesapiens is a segment of the feature 3X3D with 2 other films by Jean-Luc Godard and Peter Greenaway, and premiered at the closing night of La Semaine de la Critique of the Cannes Film festival 2013.

References

External links
 
 

Portuguese drama films
2013 3D films
2013 films
Films directed by Edgar Pêra
Portuguese short films